Azzone is a comune (municipality) in the Province of Bergamo in the Italian region of Lombardy, located about  northeast of Milan and about  northeast of Bergamo.

Azzone borders the following municipalities: Angolo Terme, Borno, Colere, Schilpario, Vilminore di Scalve.

Demographic evolution

References